Khniss (Arabic: خنيس) is a small city in the Tunisian Sahel region. It is located on the coast, 5 km south of Monastir. Its population is estimated at around 11,000 as of 2014.

Khniss is the hometown of the famous Tunisian linguist Abu Isaak Al Khounaysy who taught linguistics and grammar in  the first islamic university and research center in Africa built by the Aghlabites in Kairouan according to the Tunisian historian Hassan Hosni Abdul-Wahab 

The exact significance of the word Khniss remains mysterious. Some invoke a possible meaning of Church as a deformation of the Arabic word "kanis", others suggest a link to the word "khounais" meaning depression in Arabic. Others reckon the city and its name are of Berber origins, however the word itself is not known. In Iraq there is an old historical Assyrian village with the name of Khinnis or khenis. Also in Morocco there is a village in a Berber area with the same name. Although this may give more credit to a version arguing for a Berber origin of the word, all these guesses and hints needs further investigations.

The people of Khniss are known as peaceful, hard working, honest, and hospitable. The city is characterized by a disproportionately large number of brilliant teachers, academia, doctors, and engineers, all passionate and proud of their modest origins.

History
The city provided refuge to Arab and Muslim families evicted from Muslim Sicily (1061-1091) after the Norman conquest. Some sources mention the migrations of the Muslim Sicilians to Khniss in the 10th and 11th centuries in two waves. In the neighboring Monastir, there is the tomb of the very famous Muslim scholar Sidi El Mezri originating from Mazara in Sicily.

Traditionally, the economic activity of the city was based on olive farming, fishing, stone quarries (which left some of the neighboring landscapes disfigured), and on handcraft textile. Khniss specialized in wool processing and in weaving different sorts of high quality traditional woolen blankets, such as "ferrachia" and "abena"; dresses such as "barnous" and "kedroun"; carpets, rugs and "Klim", etc. Nowadays, the local economy is more diversified, but still dominated by an important export oriented textile industry, mostly for ready-made clothing. With the modern structure of the textile industry, the traditional woolen textile activity, which missed on the latest innovations and technologies, got a severe shock and its economic importance has declined. There is a real threat that the traditional know-how in processing woolen textiles completely fades away.

Geography
Khniss is a coastal city which features the beginning of an amazing marine depression of shallow seabed that stretches till "Cap Dimass" in Bekalta, ancient Thapsus. From Khniss to Bekalta we can observe two distinct levels in the sea. The first one is a confined lagoon with no significant marine waves or currents and called by locals "Dead Sea"; the second has moderate currents and waves, and is usually referred to as the "Live Sea". In some parts of the shallow sea beds, remains of Roman mosaics can be contemplated near the sewage treatment plant of Lamta-Sayyada. Some elders have referred to the region as "Al Maklouba" in a reference to an old myth saying the region had known a major earthquake that critically changed the landscape in the lagoon.

The lagoon of Khniss used to have a particularly rich marine biodiversity  that until a recent past sustained pretty well the livelihood of local fishermen families. A traditional ecological fishing method known as "Demmassa" was widely employed in the region and used to be productive enough for all. However, in the last few decades, the lagoon witnessed a combination of serious environmental problems that are endangering its unique ecological equilibrium. Pollution, poor planning and the complete absence of sustainable preservation strategies are the main reasons of this environmental disaster. For instance, poor planning can be witnessed in the hastily built system that deviates the rain waters to protect the airport of Skanes-Monastir and the neighboring presidential summer palace. The construction of a sand barrier (Drina) in front of the drainage course of rain waters worsened the problems. The pollution due to urban and industrial waste waters further strangled the environment and is most probably the main reason for the depletion of the marine biodiversity of the lagoon. Ambitious and well though restoration plans are urgently needed so that the lagoon could recover its original beauty and provide a viable and welcoming habitat for marine species that once prospered in the lagoon.

References

External links 

Populated places in Monastir Governorate
Communes of Tunisia